Highland Township is an inactive township in Lewis County, in the U.S. state of Missouri.

Highland Township was established in 1838, and named for its lofty elevation.

References

Townships in Missouri
Townships in Lewis County, Missouri